Celastrina is a genus of butterflies in the family Lycaenidae found in the Palearctic, Nearctic, Indomalayan and Australasian realms.

Species
Listed alphabetically:
 Celastrina acesina (Bethune-Baker, 1906) – south-eastern Papua New Guinea
 Celastrina albocoeruleus (Moore, 1879) – albocerulean
 Celastrina algernoni (Fruhstorfer, 1917) – Philippines (Luzon) and Borneo
 Celastrina argiolus (Linnaeus, 1758) – holly blue
 Celastrina asheri  (Labar, Pelham & Kondla, 2022) ) – Asher's blue
 Celastrina cardia (Felder, 1860) – pale hedge blue
 Celastrina dipora (Moore 1865) – dusky blue Cupid
 Celastrina echo (Edwards, 1864) – echo azure – California, Oregon
 Celastrina fedoseevi Korshunov & Ivonin, 1990 – Transbaikalia, Amur Oblast 
 Celastrina filipjevi (Riley, 1934) – Ussuri, northeast China, Korea 
 Celastrina gigas (Hemming, 1928) – western Himalayas, Fujian
 Celastrina gozora (Boisduval, 1870) – Mexican azure
 Celastrina hersilia (Leech, [1893]) – Nepal to China
 Celastrina huegeli (Moore, 1882) – large hedge blue
 Celastrina humulus Scott & Wright, 1998 – hops azure – Colorado
 Celastrina idella Wright & Pavulaan, 1999 – holly azure
 Celastrina iynteana (De Nicéville, 1883) – Jyntea hedge blue
 Celastrina ladon (Cramer, [1780]) – spring azure
 Celastrina ladonides (De L'Orza, 1869) – silvery hedge blue
 Celastrina lavendularis (Moore, 1877) – plain hedge blue
 Celastrina lucia (Kirby, 1837) – Lucia azure or boreal spring azure
 Celastrina morsheadi (Evans, 1915) – Tibet
 Celastrina neglecta (Edwards, 1862) – summer azure
 Celastrina neglectamajor Opler & Krizek, 1984 – Appalachian azure
 Celastrina nigra (Forbes, 1960) – spring sooty, dusky azure, or sooty azure – eastern United States
 Celastrina ogasawaraensis (Pryer, 1886) – Japan
 Celastrina oreas (Leech, [1893]) – Ussuri, China, (including Tibet and Taiwan), Nepal, northeast India (Assam), Burma, Korea 
 Celastrina perplexa Eliot & Kawazoé, 1983 – China (Kangding) 
 Celastrina phellodendroni Omelko, 1987 – Ussuri
 Celastrina philippina (Semper, 1889) – Borneo, Palawan, Philippines, Talaud, Moluccas, West Irian, Papua New Guinea, Bachan, Halmahera, Ternate, Timor, Sulawesi, Sula Islands, Ambon Island, Serang, Obi Islands
 Celastrina serotina Pavulaan & Wright, 2005 – cherry gall azure
 Celastrina sugitanii (Matsumura, 1919) – Japan, Sakhalin, Korea, northeast China

References

External links
images representing Celastrina at Consortium for the Barcode of Life

 
Lycaenidae genera